Fosterella micrantha is a plant species in the genus Fosterella. This species is native to Mexico (Nuevo León, Veracruz, Chiapas, Oaxaca, Guerrero), Guatemala, and El Salvador.

References

micrantha
Flora of Mexico
Flora of Guatemala
Plants described in 1943
Flora of El Salvador